Will Eisenmann (3 March 1906, in Stuttgart – 20 August 1992, in Canton of Lucerne) was a German-Swiss composer. His opera Der König der dunklen Kammer, based on a work by Rabindranath Tagore, won the Emil Hertzka Prize.

Selected works
Stage
 Der König der dunklen Kammer, Opera in 13 Scenes, op. 12 (1934–1935); words by Rabindranath Tagore
 Bethsabé, Drama-Pantomime-Oratorio in 3 scenes for tenor, baritone, speaking voices, actors, pantomimists and orchestra, op. 17 (1936); libretto by André Gide
 Leonce und Lena, Lyric Comedy in 3 acts for 7 soloists, 5 speaking parts and a large orchestra, op. 36 (1943–1945); libretto by Georg Büchner

Orchestral
 Die Stadt for string orchestra, op. 7 (1932–1933)
 Primavera española, op. 10 (1934)
 Die gläserne Wand (Davoser Impressionen) for small orchestra, op. 11 (1934)
 Musique en forme de spirale for small orchestra, op. 18 (1937)
 Trauermusik (Epitaphe pour Maurice Ravel), op. 21 (1938)
 Sieben Bilder nach Vincent van Gogh, op. 22 (1938)
 Symphony for string orchestra, op. 42 (1947)
 Musica concertante, op. 96 (1977–1978)

Concertante
 Concerto for alto saxophone and orchestra, op. 24 (1938)
 Concerto da camera for alto saxophone and string orchestra, op. 38 (1945)
 Concerto for soprano and alto saxophones and string orchestra, op. 69 (1962)
 Konfrontationen for flute and orchestra, op. 85 (1972)

Chamber music
 Concertino for violin (or flute) and piano, op. 8 (1933)
 Quartetto mistico, String Quartet No. 1, op. 23 (1938)
 Kleine Ballade / Nevermore for alto saxophone and piano (or organ), op. 28 (1940)
 Duo concertante for alto saxophone and piano, op. 33 (1941, 1957)
 Trio pastorale for violin, viola and cello, op. 37 (1942)
 Ballade No. 1 for flute and piano, op. 53 (1952)
 Concertino for cello and piano, op. 54 (1953)
 Divertimento for 2 clarinets and bassoon, op. 55 (1954–1955)
 Musik for viola and piano, op. 60 (1957)
 Musik für Flöte und drei Streicher for flute, violin, viola and cello, op. 61 (1959)
 Lamentatio. In memoriam Clara Haskil for flute, violin and piano, op. 65 (1960)
 Movements for alto saxophone and piano, op. 68 (1961)
 Ballade No. 2 for flute and piano, op. 74 (1964)
 Duo for flute and harp, op. 79 (1970)
 Meditationen for flute and organ, op. 88 (1975)
 Capriccio for tenor saxophone and piano, op. 92 (1977)
 Mouvements concertants for trumpet and organ, op. 95 (1977)
 Improvisation I for flute solo, op. 94 (1977)
 Improvisation II for flute solo, op. 107 (1977)
 Divertissement for 2 violins, op. 98 (1978)
 Quartetto brevis for string quartet, op. 99 (1978)
 Evocation for flute and organ, op. 100 (1980)
 Spiel zu dritt for flute, oboe and bassoon, op. 105 (1983)
 Impression for clarinet solo, op. 108 (1984)
 Metamòrfosi for oboe solo, op. 109 (1985)

Organ
 Fantasie I, op. 45 (1948)
 Fantasie II, op. 77 (1966)
 Toccata, op. 90 (1976)
 Reflessioni, op. 93 (1977)
 Praeludium, op. 97 (1978)
 Fantasie III, op. 106 (1983)

Piano
 Kleine Suite, op. 6 (1932)
 Nocturne, op. 15 (1935)
 Suite der Gegensätze, op. 51 (1949–1951)
 6 Etüden, op. 57 (1954–1960)
 Konstellationen, op. 66 (1960)
 Varianten, op. 71 (1962)
 Kleine Klavierstücke, op. 78 (1954–1974)
 Trois Images, op. 80 (1970)
 Trois Esquisses, op. 82 (1971)

Vocal
 Drei Gesänge aus Seraphine for high voice and small orchestra, op. 16 (1936); words by Heinrich Heine
 Es Wiegeliedli for voice and piano, op. 30 (1940)
 Hesse-Lieder for voice and piano, op. 32 (1936–1940); words by Hermann Hesse
 Rubaiyat, 2 Song Cycles for voice and piano, op. 35 (1939–1943); words by Omar Khayyám
 Gesänge im Zwielicht for voice and piano, op. 39 (1945); words by Rainer Maria Rilke and Anette Brun
 under der linden for voice and piano, op. 44 (1948); words by Walther von der Vogelweide
 Alkestis, Dramatic Scene for high voice and large orchestra, op. 46 (1948–1949); words by Rainer Maria Rilke
 Marienlegende for high voice, viola and piano, op. 50 (1950); words by Klabund
 Der Teppich des Lebens for voice and piano, op. 52 (1951); words by Stefan George
 Sänge eines fahrenden Spielmanns for alto, viola and piano, op. 56 (1954); words by Stefan George
 Gesänge des Abschieds for voice and piano, op. 58 (1955); words by Georg Heym
 Sechs Gesänge nach Gedichten von Urs Oberlin for medium voice and piano, op. 59 (1956); words by Urs Oberlin
 Acht Gesänge nach Gedichten von Astrid Claes for alto and piano, op. 62 (1959–1960); words by Astrid Claes
 Haiku I. Melodien nach japanischen Dreizeilern for high voice and piano, op. 64 (1960)
 Legende von der Entstehung des Buches Taoteking for medium voice and piano, op. 70 (1962); words by Bertolt Brecht
 Der blinde Passagier for voice and piano, op. 75 (1964)
 Haiku II. Melodien nach japanischen Dreizeilern for high voice and piano, op. 83 (1971)
 Haiku III. Melodien nach heiter-ironischen japanischen Dreizeilern for medium voice, oboe and piano, op. 86 (1973)
 Gesänge zur Nacht for alto and organ, op. 91 (1976); words by Georg Trakl
 Gesänge nach Worten von Linus David for medium voice and piano (or organ), op. 102 (1981); words by Linus David

Choral
 Mallorca-Suite for mixed choir, op. 13 (1936)
 Die Klage Hiobs for baritone, mixed choir, children's choir and large orchestra, op. 49 (1950)
 Threnoi 4 Madrigals for vocal ensemble, op. 67 (1961)
 Aus canto 81 (Pisaner Gesänge) for six-part mixed choir, op. 73 (1963);; words by Ezra Pound
 Der heilige Martin von Tours, Motets for vocal ensemble or four-part mixed choir, op. 89 (1975); words by the composer

External links
Will Eisenmann website
List of works at Musinfo, Database of Swiss Music

1906 births
1992 deaths
Swiss classical composers
Musicians from Stuttgart
German opera composers
Male opera composers
20th-century classical composers
German male classical composers
20th-century German composers
20th-century German male musicians
German emigrants to Switzerland
20th-century Swiss composers